Martha Brookes Hutcheson (October 2, 1871 – 1959) was an American landscape architect, lecturer, and author, active in New England, New York, and New Jersey.

Biography
Hutcheson was born in New York City as Martha Brookes Brown, and as a child spent her summers on a family farm near Burlington, Vermont. From 1893 to 1895 she studied at the New York School of Applied Design for Women, and in the late 1890s toured Europe where she studied gardens in England, France, and Italy. As Hutcheson later wrote in The Spirit of the Garden:

In 1900 she entered MIT's new landscape architecture program at age 29, where she studied for two years before leaving without degree in 1902. She subsequently designed the grounds of several residential estates near Boston, most notably Frederick Moseley's large Newburyport estate, 1904-1906 (now Maudslay State Park), and the garden at Alice Mary Longfellow's house (now the Longfellow House–Washington's Headquarters National Historic Site) in Cambridge.

She also was the landscape architect for the Poplar Hill and Welwyn estates in Glen Cove, New York.

After Hutcheson's marriage in 1911, she retired from commercial practice but she began to landscape her own garden (5 acres) on the couple's  farm in Chester Township, New Jersey. Its overall design was influenced by classical Italian gardens, featuring a pond enclosed by native plants, vegetable garden, flower borders, orchards, allées, and farm buildings. This farm, with garden, is now preserved as the Bamboo Brook Outdoor Education Center.

In 1935 she was named a fellow in the American Society of Landscape Architects, the third woman to receive this distinction. Although Hutcheson executed dozens of commissions, including gardens at Bennington College and Billings Farm (now the Marsh-Billings-Rockefeller National Historical Park), most of her works have been lost.

Gallery

Selected works 
 The Spirit of the Garden, 1923, reprinted by University of Massachusetts Press, 2001. .

References

 Against all Odds: MIT’s Pioneering Women of Landscape Architecture
 Designing Woman: Martha Brookes Hutcheson
 Thoren, Roxi. “Dreaming True” Places Journal 2018.

External links
 

American landscape architects
1871 births
1959 deaths
Women landscape architects
New York School of Applied Design for Women alumni
People from Chester Township, New Jersey